Tennessee class is the name of several ship classes.

It may refer to:

 , a United States Navy class from the interwar period between WWI and WWII
 , a United States Navy class from the turn of the 20th century

See also
 , several ships of the name